The Quezon Convention Center is a multi-purpose convention center in Quezon located near the Provincial Capitol in Lucena, Quezon, Philippines. The venue has hosted local and regional basketball competitions, concerts, and conferences.

President Gloria Macapagal Arroyo led the inauguration rites of the facility on August 19, 2002. It was constructed using the savings of the Quezon provincial government.

The arena hosted a number of concerts and fine performances such as Sharon Cuneta, Gary Valenciano, Pops Fernandez, Martin Nievera, Regine Velasquez, Kyla, the APO Hiking Society, Sam Milby and Kim Chiu, Wolfgang, and Aiza Seguerra. Even international artist gospel singer-songwriter Don Moen has performed in the arena.

The arena has also held games for various sports leagues, including the Philippine Basketball Association, Maharlika Pilipinas Basketball League, Liga Pilipinas, and Philippine Basketball League. Starting in 2023, it will be the home arena of the expansion Quezon Huskers of the MPBL.

References

Convention centers in the Philippines
Buildings and structures in Lucena, Philippines
Basketball venues in the Philippines